Juan Ramón Mejía Erazo (born 1 August 1988) is a Honduran footballer who plays for Lobos UPNFM and the Honduras national football team.

International career
He debuted internationally on 14 November 2019, in the CONCACAF Nations League and scored his first goal for Honduras against non-FIFA member Martinique in a 1–1 draw.

References

1988 births
Living people
Deportes Savio players
C.D. Olimpia players
Real C.D. España players
Juticalpa F.C. players
C.D. Real Sociedad players
C.D. Malacateco players
C.D. Real de Minas players
Liga Nacional de Fútbol Profesional de Honduras players
Liga Nacional de Fútbol de Guatemala players
Honduran footballers
Honduran expatriate footballers
Expatriate footballers in Guatemala
Honduran expatriate sportspeople in Guatemala
Honduras international footballers
Sportspeople from Tegucigalpa
Association football forwards